Bowling for Columbine is a 2002 documentary film written, produced, directed, and narrated by Michael Moore. The film explores what Moore suggests are the primary causes for the Columbine High School massacre in 1999 and other acts of gun violence. He focuses on the background and environment in which the massacre took place and some common public opinions and assumptions about related issues. The film also looks into the nature of violence in the United States, and American violence abroad.

A critical and commercial success, the film brought Moore international attention as a rising filmmaker and won numerous awards, including the Academy Award for Best Documentary Feature, the Independent Spirit Award for Best Documentary Feature, a special 55th Anniversary Prize at the 2002 Cannes Film Festival, and the César Award for Best Foreign Film. The film is widely considered one of the greatest documentary films of all time.

Film content
In Moore's discussions with various people—including South Park co-creator Matt Stone, the National Rifle Association's then-president Charlton Heston, and musician Marilyn Manson—he seeks to explain why the Columbine massacre occurred and why the United States' violent crime rate (especially concerning crimes committed with firearms) is substantially higher than those of other nations.

Bowling
The film's title refers to the story that Eric Harris and Dylan Klebold—the two students responsible for the Columbine High School massacre—attended a school bowling class at 6:00 AM on the day they committed the attacks at school, which started at 11:17 AM. Later investigations showed that this was based on mistaken recollections, and Glenn Moore of the Golden Police Department concluded that they were absent from school on the day the attack took place.

Moore incorporates the concept of recreational bowling into the film in other ways as well. For example, the Michigan Militia use bowling pins for their target practice. When interviewing former classmates of the two boys, Moore notes that the students took a bowling class in place of physical education. He suggests that this might have very little educational value and the people he interviews generally agree, noting how Harris and Klebold led introverted lifestyles and had careless attitudes towards the game, and that nobody thought twice about it. Moore questions whether the school system is responding to the real needs of students or if they are reinforcing fear. Moore also interviews two young residents of Oscoda, Michigan. Moore suggests a culture of fear created by the government and the media leads Americans to arm themselves, to the advantage of gun-making companies. Moore suggests that bowling could have been just as responsible for the attacks on the school as Marilyn Manson, or even President Bill Clinton, who launched bombing attacks on Serbia at the time.

Free gun for opening a bank account

An early scene depicts a bank in northern Michigan that gives customers a free hunting rifle when they make a deposit of a certain size into a time deposit account. The film follows Moore as he goes to the bank, makes his deposit, fills out the forms, and awaits the result of a background check before walking out of the bank carrying a brand new Weatherby hunting rifle. Just before leaving the bank, Moore asks: "Do you think it's a little dangerous handing out guns at a bank?"

In Michael Wilson's documentary Michael Moore Hates America, bank employees from the branch at which Moore is handed a free hunting rifle assert that they were misled during filming of the segment. They say that the bank's policy was to conduct background checks on rifle recipients and mail the rifles to a licensed gun dealer, but Moore's agents, under the pretext of "doing a story on unique businesses across America", convinced bank employees to have his rifle presented to him on camera the morning after filming his account opening. Moore denied that this sequence was staged but acknowledged the timing of events was compressed for production reasons. He reminded his viewers that North Country Bank is a licensed firearms dealer and, in addition to its ATF license number, he produced out-takes where bank employee Jan Jacobson confirms on camera that rifles are secured locally on bank premises.

"Happiness Is a Warm Gun" montage
About 20 minutes into the film, the Beatles song "Happiness Is a Warm Gun" plays during a montage in which footage of the following is shown:

 People buying guns
 Residents of Virgin, Utah, a town that passed a law requiring all residents to own guns
 People firing rifles at carnivals and shooting ranges
 Denise Ames operating a rifle
 Carey McWilliams, a blind gun enthusiast from Fargo, North Dakota
 Gary Plauché killing Jeff Doucet, who had kidnapped and molested Plauché's son
 The suicide of R. Budd Dwyer
 A 1993 murder where Emilio Nuñez shot and killed his ex-wife Maritza Martin during an interview on the Telemundo program Ocurrió Así
 The suicide of Daniel V. Jones, an AIDS and cancer patient who was protesting health maintenance organizations
 A man who takes his shirt off and is shot during a riot

Weapons of mass destruction
Early in the film, Moore links the violent behavior of the Columbine shooters to the presence of a large defense establishment manufacturing rocket technology in Littleton. It is implied that the presence of this facility within the community, and the acceptance of institutionalized violence as a solution to conflict, contributed to the mindset that led to the massacre.

Moore conducts an interview with Evan McCollum, Director of Communications at a Lockheed Martin plant near Columbine, and asks him:

McCollum responds:

After the release of the film, McCollum clarified that the plant no longer produces missiles (the plant manufactured parts for intercontinental ballistic missiles with a nuclear warhead in the mid-1980s), but rockets used for launching satellites:

Erik Möller argues that Moore's question was not limited to the Littleton-area Lockheed Martin facility:

"What a Wonderful World" montage
The film cuts to a montage of American foreign policy decisions, with the intent to counter McCollum's statement by citing examples of how the United States has frequently been the aggressor nation. This montage is set to the song "What a Wonderful World", performed by Louis Armstrong.

The following is a transcript of the onscreen text in the Wonderful World segment:

 1953: U.S. overthrows Prime Minister Mohammad Mosaddegh of Iran. U.S. installs Shah Pahlavi as absolute monarch.
 1954: U.S. overthrows democratically elected President Jacobo Árbenz of Guatemala as part of a conflict that resulted in up to 200,000 civilians killed.
 1963: U.S. backs assassination of South Vietnamese President Ngo Dinh Diem.
 1963–75: The American military kills 4 million people during the Vietnam War.
 September 11, 1973: U.S. stages 1973 Chilean coup d'état in Chile. Democratically elected President Salvador Allende assassinated. Dictator Augusto Pinochet installed. 3,000 Chileans murdered.
 1977: U.S. backs military Junta of El Salvador. 70,000 Salvadorans and four American nuns killed.
 1980s: U.S. trains Osama bin Laden and fellow mujahideen to kill Soviets. CIA gives them $3 billion.
 1981: Reagan administration trains and funds the Contras. 30,000 Nicaraguans die.
 1982: U.S. provides billions of dollars in aid to Saddam Hussein for weapons to kill Iranians.
 1983: The White House secretly gives Iran weapons to kill Iraqis.
 1989: CIA agent Manuel Noriega (also serving as President of Panama) disobeys orders from Washington, D.C. U.S. invades Panama and removes Noriega. 3,000 Panamanian civilian casualties.
 1990: Iraq invades Kuwait with weapons from U.S.
 1991: U.S. enters Iraq. George H. W. Bush reinstates absolute monarch of Kuwait.
 1998: Clinton bombs possible weapons factory in Sudan. Factory turns out to be making aspirin.
 1991 to 2003: American planes bomb Iraq on a weekly basis. U.N. estimates 500,000 Iraqi children die from bombing and sanctions.
 2000–01: U.S. gives Taliban-ruled Afghanistan $245 million in aid.
 September 11, 2001: Osama bin Laden uses his expert CIA training to murder 2,977 people.

The montage ends with handheld-camera footage of United Airlines Flight 175 crashing into the South Tower of the World Trade Center on September 11, 2001, the audio consisting solely of the emotional reactions of the witnesses, recorded by the camera's microphone. On the website accompanying the film, Moore provides additional background information for this section.

Climate of fear
Moore contrasts his portrayal of the U.S. attitude toward guns and violence with the attitude prevailing in areas of Canada where gun ownership is at similar levels to the U.S. He illustrates his thesis by visiting neighborhoods in Canada near the Canada–U.S. border, where he finds front doors unlocked and much less concern over crime and security. In regards to the film, Farber states "Moore's thesis, which he later elaborated in Fahrenheit 9/11, is that the fear-mongering that permeates American society contributes to our epidemic of gun violence". Moore shows news stories in Canada which do not follow the "if it bleeds it leads" mentality. This adds to Moore's argument that the media is driving America's fear as well as their need for protection. The cartoon "A Brief History of the United States of America" encompasses Moore's view of where the fear in America started and how it's progressed and changed over the years.

In this section, there is a montage of several social pundits stating possible causes for gun violence. Many claim links with violence in television, cinema, and computer games; towards the end of the montage, however, the same people all change their claims to Marilyn Manson's responsibility. Following this is an interview between Moore and Marilyn Manson. Manson shares his views about the United States' climate with Moore, stating that he believes U.S. society is based on "fear and consumption", citing Colgate commercials that promise "if you have bad breath, [people] are not going to talk to you" and other commercials containing fear-based messages. Manson also mentions that the media, under heavy government influence, had asserted that his influence on the acts of Klebold and Harris was far greater than that of President Clinton, who ordered more bombings on Kosovo on April 20, 1999, than any other day during the NATO campaign against Yugoslavia. When Moore asks Manson what he would say to the students at Columbine, Manson replies, "I wouldn't say a single word to them; I would listen to what they have to say, and that's what no one did."

South Park co-creator Matt Stone—who grew up in Littleton—agreed to talk with Moore about his hometown and the shooting in the film. Although he did not feel that Moore mischaracterized him or his statements in the film, he harbored ill feelings about the cartoon "A Brief History of the United States of America". Both Stone and his fellow South Park creator Trey Parker felt that the cartoon was done in a style very similar to theirs, and its proximity to Stone's interview may have led viewers to believe that they created the cartoon. "It was a good lesson in what Michael Moore does in films. He doesn't necessarily say explicitly this is what it is, but he creates meaning where there is none by cutting things together," Stone remarked in a later interview. As a humorous retort to this, Stone and Parker portrayed Moore as "a gibbering, overweight, hot-dog-eating buffoon" who ultimately commits a suicide bombing against the protagonists in their 2004 film, Team America: World Police.

Statistics
Moore follows up by exploring popular explanations as to why gun violence is so high in the United States. He examines Marilyn Manson as a cause, but states that more German citizens listen to Marilyn Manson (per capita) and that the country has a larger Goth population than the United States, with less gun violence (Germany: 381 incidents per year). He examines violent movies, but notes that other countries have the same violent movies, showing The Matrix with French subtitles (France: 255 incidents per year). He also examines video games, but observes that many violent video games come from Japan (Japan: 39 incidents per year). He concludes his comparisons by considering the suggestion that the United States' violent history is the cause, but notes the similarly violent histories of Germany, Japan, France, and the United Kingdom (68 incidents per year). Moore ends this segment with gun-related-deaths-per-year statistics of the following countries:

 Japan: 39 (0.030/100,000)
 Australia: 65 (0.292/100,000)
 United Kingdom: 68 (0.109/100,000)
 Canada: 165 (0.484/100,000)
 France: 255 (0.389/100,000)
 Germany: 381 (0.466/100,000)
 United States: 11,127 (3.601/100,000)

The American Prospect published a piece by Garance Franke-Ruta criticizing the film for ignoring the role that municipal governance plays in crime in the United States, and ignoring African-American urban victims of violence while focusing on the unusual events of Columbine. "A decline in murders in New York City alone—from 1,927 in 1993 to 643 in 2001—had, for example, a considerable impact on the declining national rate. Not a lot of those killers or victims were the sort of sports-hunters or militiamen Moore goes out of his way to interview and make fun of."

Kmart refund
Moore takes two Columbine survivors, Mark Taylor and Richard Castaldo (along with Brooks Brown, who remains unidentified during the segment), to the Troy, Michigan headquarters of American superstore Kmart to claim a refund on the bullets still lodged in their bodies, which were purchased by the perpetrators at a Kmart store. Moore and the victims wait for hours in the building's lobby, speaking to several Kmart employees, who evade the issue. Moore then decides to visit a Kmart in nearby Sterling Heights, where they purchase the store's entire supply of ammunition, and the three return to the company's headquarters the following day with several members of the local media. The company's vice president of communications is quickly sent down to address Moore and the press, and announces that the company will phase out handgun ammunition sales within 90 days. "We've won," says Moore, in disbelief. "That was more than we asked for."

Charlton Heston interview
For the final scene of the film, Moore visits Charlton Heston's home and asks to speak to him via the speakerbox in front of his gated home. Heston declines to speak to him at the time, but agrees to look at his schedule for the next day. Moore returns and first shows his NRA card, which Heston expresses pleasure at. They go inside the large property and sit down to discuss American firearm violence. Heston's response includes the suggestions that the United States has a "history of violence" and more "mixed ethnicity" than other countries. He also states that he does not believe that the United States is any more violent than other countries. Moore then asks Heston if he would like to apologize for leading NRA rallies in Flint, Michigan (Moore's hometown) after the shooting death of a six-year-old girl at Buell Elementary School and in Littleton after the Columbine shooting. Heston claims he did not know about girl's death or how soon the rally was after it. When Moore presses to know if he would have cancelled the rally, he declines to answer and walks out of the interview. Moore implores him not to leave and asks him to look at a picture of the girl. Heston turns around, but then turns back to continue his exit. Upon his exit, Moore leaves the picture outside the home. Moore was later criticized by some for his perceived "ambush" of the actor.

"I'm uncomfortable watching the scene now, and I’m uncomfortable sitting there with him," Moore told Vanity Fair'''s Katey Rich in 2019. "But I wasn't going to not put it in the film either. He revealed his core beliefs. But I remember feeling kind of sad about it later. Here's a man who 40 years prior to that marched with Martin Luther King, and now in his elderly years had just turned into this angry white guy who believed that we should have these laws where it's O.K. to shoot first and ask questions later."

Dedication
The film is dedicated to the memory of three people who all died in gun related circumstances:

 John Alberts, a sound designer and mixer for much of Moore's work. He had initially been hired to do the sound work on the film, but killed himself with a gun in January 2001.
 Herbert "Sluggo" Cleaves Jr., the oldest child of two of Moore's closest friends. He was shot in the stomach in a drive-by shooting and died at an area hospital in February 2001.
 Laura Wilcox, a victim of handgun violence who was killed in the 2001 Nevada County shootings. Her death led to the implementation of Laura's Law, which allows compulsory treatment of patients with violent psychiatric disorders.

Release

Critical reception
The film earned mostly positive reviews. On the review aggregator Rotten Tomatoes, it holds a 95% approval rating based on 173 reviews, with an average rating of 8.20/10. The consensus states, "Though it may not always convince, Bowling for Columbine asks important questions and provokes thought." Another score aggregator, Metacritic, which assigns a weighted average rating in the 0–100 range based on reviews from top mainstream critics, calculated a score of 72 based on 32 reviews, signifying 'generally favorable reviews'.

Michael Wilmington of the Chicago Tribune wrote, "It's unnerving, stimulating, likely to provoke anger and sorrow on both political sides—and, above all, it's extremely funny." A.O. Scott of The New York Times wrote, "The slippery logic, tendentious grandstanding, and outright demagoguery on display in Bowling for Columbine should be enough to give pause to its most ardent partisans, while its disquieting insights into the culture of violence in America should occasion sober reflection from those who would prefer to stop their ears."

However, the film had its detractors as Desson Thomson of The Washington Post thought that the film lacked a coherent message, asking "A lot of this is amusing and somehow telling. There was a parody of this movie called 'Bowling for Midway', a conservative Utah family movie to counter Moore's movie, and this paralleled the Docudrama, 'This Divided State'. But what does it all add up to?"

MPAA rating
The film was rated R by the Motion Picture Association of America, which means that children under the age of 17 were not admitted to see the film theatrically unless under supervision. Film critic Roger Ebert chastized the MPAA for this move as "banning teenagers from those films they most need to see". Ebert had criticized the MPAA rating system on previous occasions. The film was noted for "some violent images and language".

Gross revenue
With a budget of $4 million, Bowling for Columbine grossed $58,008,423 worldwide, including $21,576,018 in the United States. The documentary also broke box office records internationally, becoming the highest-grossing documentary in the United Kingdom, Australia, and Austria. These records were later eclipsed by Moore's next documentary, Fahrenheit 9/11.

Awards and nominations
 2002 Winner, 55th Anniversary Prize, 2002 Cannes Film Festival
 2002 Winner, VPRO IDFA Audience Award, International Documentary Film Festival Amsterdam
 2003 Winner, César Awards, Best Foreign Film
 2003 Winner, International Documentary Association (IDA) - Best Documentary of All Time
 2003 Winner, Academy Award, Best Documentary Feature

During the screening at the 2002 Cannes Film Festival the film received a 13-minute standing ovation. It also won "Most Popular International Film" at the 2002 Vancouver International Film Festival.

Moore was both applauded and booed at the Academy Awards on March 23, 2003, when he used his acceptance speech as an opportunity to proclaim his opposition to the presidency of George W. Bush and the United States-led invasion of Iraq, which had begun just a few days earlier.Michael Moore winning an Oscar® for "Bowling for Columbine" - Oscars on YouTube

In 2005, it was voted the third most popular film in the British Channel 4 program The 50 Greatest Documentaries of all time.

Home mediaBowling for Columbine'' was released on VHS and DVD by MGM Home Entertainment in 2003. The film was released on DVD and Blu-ray in a digital restoration with supplementary features by the Criterion Collection in June 2018.

References

External links

 
 
 
 
 Bowling for Columbine at Metro-Goldwyn-Mayer
Bowling for Columbine: By Any Means Necessary an essay by Eric Hynes at the Criterion Collection
 Full documentary movie, free for viewing at Michael Moore's Youtube Channel

Works about the Columbine High School massacre
2002 films
2002 documentary films
American documentary films
American independent films
Canadian documentary films
Canadian independent films
German documentary films
German independent films
Ten-pin bowling films
English-language Canadian films
English-language German films
Films directed by Michael Moore
Documentary films about American politics
Films about school violence
United Artists films
Best Documentary Feature Academy Award winners
Best Foreign Film César Award winners
Films with live action and animation
Lessin and Deal productions
DHX Media films
Alliance Atlantis films
Cultural depictions of George W. Bush
Documentary films about violence
Documentary films about the military–industrial complex
Films about coups d'état
Documentary films about crime in the United States
Cultural depictions of Bill Clinton
2000s English-language films
2000s American films
2000s Canadian films
2000s German films